|}
{| class="collapsible collapsed" cellpadding="0" cellspacing="0" style="clear:right; float:right; text-align:center; font-weight:bold;" width="280px"
! colspan="3" style="border:1px solid black; background-color: #77DD77;" | Also Ran

The 1995 Epsom Derby was a horse race which took place at Epsom Downs on Saturday 10 June 1995. It was the 216th running of the Derby, and it was won by Lammtarra. The winner was ridden by Walter Swinburn and trained by Saeed bin Suroor. The pre-race favourite Pennekamp finished eleventh.

Race details
 Sponsor: Vodafone
 Winner's prize money: £504,500
 Going: Good to Firm
 Number of runners: 15
 Winner's time: 2m 32.31s (new record)

Full result

* The distances between the horses are shown in lengths or shorter. shd = short-head; hd = head; nk = neck.† Trainers are based in Great Britain unless indicated.

Winner's details
Further details of the winner, Lammtarra:

 Foaled: 2 February 1992, in Kentucky, US
 Sire: Nijinsky; Dam: Snow Bride (Blushing Groom)
 Owner: Saeed bin Maktoum Al Maktoum
 Breeder: Gainsborough Farms
 Rating in 1995 International Classifications: 130

Form analysis

Two-year-old races
Notable runs by the future Derby participants as two-year-olds in 1994.

 Lammtarra – 1st Washington Singer Stakes
 Presenting – 1st Autumn Stakes
 Fahal – 4th Superlative Stakes, 3rd Solario Stakes, 1st Stardom Stakes, 4th Royal Lodge Stakes, 6th Racing Post Trophy
 Court of Honour – 6th Haynes, Hanson and Clark Stakes, 3rd Gran Criterium, 1st Premio Guido Berardelli
 Humbel – 1st Eyrefield Stakes
 Munwar – 1st Haynes, Hanson and Clark Stakes
 Pennekamp – 1st Prix de la Salamandre, 1st Dewhurst Stakes
 Korambi – 8th Royal Lodge Stakes
 Daffaq – 4th Washington Singer Stakes
 Maralinga – 7th Chesham Stakes

The road to Epsom
Early-season appearances in 1995 and trial races prior to running in the Derby.

 Tamure – 1st Glasgow Stakes
 Presenting – 1st Newmarket Stakes, 3rd Dante Stakes
 Fahal – 3rd Predominate Stakes
 Court of Honour – 2nd Chester Vase, 2nd Derby Italiano
 Vettori – 1st Poule d'Essai des Poulains
 Riyadian – 2nd Lingfield Derby Trial
 Humbel – 1st Ballysax Stakes, 1st Derrinstown Stud Derby Trial
 Munwar – 1st Feilden Stakes, 1st Lingfield Derby Trial
 Salmon Ladder – 6th Dante Stakes
 Pennekamp – 1st Prix Djebel, 1st 2,000 Guineas
 Spectrum – 1st Irish 2,000 Guineas
 Maralinga – 3rd Chester Vase

Subsequent Group 1 wins
Group 1 / Grade I victories after running in the Derby.

 Lammtarra – King George VI and Queen Elizabeth Stakes (1995), Prix de l'Arc de Triomphe (1995)
 Court of Honour – Gran Premio del Jockey Club (1995)
 Spectrum – Champion Stakes (1995)

Subsequent breeding careers
Leading progeny of participants in the 1995 Epsom Derby.

Sires of Classic winners
Spectrum (13th) - Later stood in South Africa
 Golan - 1st 2000 Guineas Stakes (2001)
 Tartan Bearer - 2nd Epsom Derby (2008)
 Gamut - 1st Grand Prix de Saint-Cloud (2004)
 Glencove Marina - 2nd Hennessy Gold Cup (2011)

Sires of Group/Grade One winners
Vettori (6th)
 St. Basil - 1st Stradbroke Handicap (2005)
 Sound Action - 1st Australasian Oaks(2003)
 Lady Vettori - 3rd Prix Marcel Boussac (1999) - Dam of Lope de Vega
 Hightori - 3rd King George VI and Queen Elizabeth Stakes (2001)

Sires of National Hunt horses
Presenting (3rd)
 Denman - 1st Cheltenham Gold Cup (2008)
 War Of Attrition - 1st Cheltenham Gold Cup (2006)
 First Lieutenant - 1st Betfred Bowl (2013)
 Knotted Midge - Dam of Might Bite (2nd Cheltenham Gold Cup (2018)
Tamure (2nd)
 Bitofapuzzle - 1st Mares Novice Hurdle Championship Final (2015)
 Get On The Yager - 1st Rowland Meyrick Handicap Chase (2017)
 Thomas Crapper - 1st Greatwood Gold Cup (2017)
Pennekamp (11th) 
 Penzance - 1st Triumph Hurdle (2005)
 Camomille - Dam of Camping Ground (1st Relkeel Hurdle 2016, 1st National Spirit Hurdle 2017)
 Pennegale - Dam of Lily Of The Valley (1st Prix de l'Opéra 2010) and Mubtaahij (2nd Dubai World Cup 2016)
 Shadow Song - Dam of Jan Vermeer (3rd Irish Derby 2010) and Together (2nd 1000 Guineas Stakes 2nd Irish 1,000 Guineas 2010)

Other Stallions
Lammtarra (1st) - Melikah - (2nd Irish Oaks, 3rd Epsom Oaks 2000), Simeon (1st Classic Trial 2002)'Humbel (8th) - Thetwincamdrift (2nd Prestige Novices' Hurdle 2009)Fahal (4th) - Exported to South AfricaCourt Of Honour (5th) - Exported to South AfricaRiyadian (7th) - Exported to Peru where champion sire - also had spell in Chile

References

External links
 Colour Chart – Derby 1995

Epsom Derby
 1995
Epsom Derby
Epsom Derby
20th century in Surrey